The Twenty-Third Legislature of the Territory of Hawaii was a session of the Hawaii Territorial Legislature.  The session convened in Honolulu, Hawaii, and ran from February 21 until May 4, 1945.  It was the final session convened in Hawaii during World War II, and the first session convened after  martial law ended on October 24, 1944.

Legislative session
The session ran from February 21 until May 4, 1945. It passed 277 bills into law, including Act 1, which enacted the Revised Laws of Hawaii 1945, a major repeal, consolidation and enactment of territorial law.

Senators

House of Representatives

References

Notes

Hawaii legislative sessions